Fashion Outlets of Niagara Falls is an outlet mall serving Niagara Falls, New York.

History
In 1982, the outlet mall opened in a former King's discount store.

An extensive 1995 expansion added sixty stores, including a Saks Fifth Avenue outlet store called Off Fifth. In 1997, the mall was acquired by Prime Retail (now part of The Lightstone Group) for $89 million. A $12 million renovation in 2006 added new tenants and renamed the complex Fashion Outlets Niagara Falls USA. The mall became a Macerich property in 2011. A further 175,000 sq. ft. expansion opened on October 23, 2014
with a ribbon-cutting ceremony on November 6, 2014 with festivities and entertainment until November 9, 2014.

See also
 Rainbow Centre Factory Outlet - former rival opened in 1982 and was closed due to competition from Fashion Outlets.

References

External links

Outlet malls in the United States
Shopping malls established in 1982
Shopping malls in New York (state)
Macerich